Olea capensis, the black ironwood, is an African tree species in the olive family Oleaceae. It is widespread in sub-Saharan Africa: from the east in Somalia, Ethiopia and Sudan, south to the tip of South Africa, and west to Cameroon, Sierra Leone and the islands of the Gulf of Guinea, as well as Madagascar and the Comoros. It occurs in bush, littoral scrub and evergreen forest.

Other common names in English include ironwood, ironwood olive, East African olive and Elgon olive.

Description
Bark: light grey, becoming dark grey and vertically fissured with age; a characteristic blackish gum is exuded from bark wounds. 
Leaves: light to dark green and glossy above and paler green below; petiole often purplish, 0.3–1.7 cm long; lanceolate-oblong to almost circular, 3–10 x 1.5–5 cm. 
Flowers: white or cream and sweetly scented, small and in many flowered axillary or terminal heads, bisexual, 3–15 cm long. 
Fruit: when ripe they are somewhat succulent purplish drupes; ovoid up to 2 x 1 cm.

Subspecies
The species has been divided into 3 subspecies: 
Olea capensis subsp. macrocarpa: flowers in lax heads, fruits oblong to elliptic. 
Olea capensis subsp. capensis: flowers in dense heads, leaves very variable, apex often rounded, and fruits almost spherical to oblong elliptic. 
Olea capensis subsp. enervis: leaves usually broadly elliptic, apex tapering.

Uses

Food
Olea capensis has masses of sweetly scented bisexual flowers, that produce large edible fruits.
Timber
The wood of the tree is very hard, fine grained, and heavy, and although difficult to work, it is widely used for art and artifacts. 
Gardens
Olea capensis is cultivated as an ornamental tree in parks and gardens.

The Guinness Book of World Records lists this tree as the world's heaviest wood, with a specific gravity of 1.49, similar to that of anthracite or dry earth. It is known for its tendency to sink in water, unlike other wood materials. It is also the one of the world's hardest woods according to the Janka hardness test. The timber has a good abrasion resistance and is very strong. It is an excellent turnery wood, and is used for a wide range of decorative items.

Gallery

References

capensis
Trees of Africa
Fodder
Wood
Drought-tolerant trees
Fruits originating in Africa
Garden plants of Africa
Ornamental trees
Plants described in 1753
Taxa named by Carl Linnaeus
Afromontane flora